Novy Mir is a Russian-language monthly literary magazine.

History
Novy Mir has been published in Moscow since January 1925. It was supposed to be modelled on the popular pre-Soviet literary magazine Mir Bozhy ("God's World"), which was published from 1892 to 1906, and its follow-up, Sovremenny Mir ("Contemporary World"), which was published from 1906 to 1917. Novy Mir mainly published prose that approved of the general line of the Communist Party.

In the early 1960s, Novy Mir changed its political stance, leaning to a dissident position. In November 1962 the magazine became famous for publishing Aleksandr Solzhenitsyn's groundbreaking One Day in the Life of Ivan Denisovich, a novella about a prisoner of the Gulag. In the same year its circulation was about 150,000 copies a month. The magazine continued publishing controversial articles and stories about various aspects of Soviet and Russian history despite the fact that its editor-in-chief, Alexander Tvardovsky, facing significant political pressure, resigned in February 1970. With the appointment of Sergey Zalygin in 1986, at the beginning of perestroika, the magazine practised increasingly bold criticism of the Soviet government, including figures such as Mikhail Gorbachev. It also published fiction and poetry by previously banned writers, such as George Orwell, Joseph Brodsky and Vladimir Nabokov.

Editors-in-chief
 Ivan Skvortsov-Stepanov (1925–1926)
Vyacheslav Polonsky (1926–1931)
 Ivan Gronsky (1931–1937)
 Vladimir Stavsky (1937–1941)
 Vladimir Shcherbina (1941–1946)
 Konstantin Simonov (1946–1950)
 Alexander Tvardovsky (1950–1954)
 Konstantin Simonov (1954–1957)
 Alexander Tvardovsky (1958–1970)
 Valery Kosolapov (1970–1974)
 Sergei Narovchatov (1974–1981)
 Vladimir Karpov (1981–1986)
 Sergey Zalygin (1986–1998)
 Andrei Vasilevsky (1998- )

Contemporary authors
Today Novy Mir is considered a leading Russian literary magazine and has a liberal orientation.

In the 2000s, the following authors have been published: Maxim Amelin, Arkadi Babchenko, Dmitry Bak, Vladimir Berezin, Dmitry Bykov, Dmitry Danilov, Vladimir Gandelsman, Alisa Ganieva, Alexander Ilichevsky, Alexander Karasyov, Leonid Kostyukov, Yuri Kublanovsky, Alexander Kushner, Yulia Latynina, Vladimir Makanin, Anatoly Nayman, Yevgeni Popov, Zakhar Prilepin, Valery Pustovaya, Sergey Soloukh, Andrei Volos, Oleg Yermakov and others.

See also
 List of literary magazines

Footnotes

Further reading
 Edith Rogovin Frankel, Novy Mir: A Case Study in the Politics of Literature, 1952-1958. Cambridge, England: Cambridge University Press, 2009.
 Michael Glenny, Novy Mir. A Selection 1925-1967. London: Jonathan Cape, 1972.

External links

1925 establishments in the Soviet Union
Magazines established in 1925
Magazines published in Moscow
Russian-language magazines
Literary magazines published in Russia
Monthly magazines published in Russia
Literary magazines published in the Soviet Union